Grace Naledi Mandisa Pandor (née Matthews; born 7 December 1953) is a South African politician, educator and academic serving as the Minister of International Relations and Cooperation since 2019. She has served as a Member of Parliament (MP) for the African National Congress (ANC) since 1994.

Born in Durban, Pandor completed high school in Botswana. She qualified as a teacher and taught at multiple schools and universities, whilst she achieved various degrees from different universities. Pandor took office as a Member of Parliament in 1994. She soon became Deputy Chief Whip of the ANC caucus in 1995. She was elected Deputy Chairperson of the National Council of Provinces in 1998 and became chairperson in 1999.

She initially became a member of the national cabinet in 2004, following President Thabo Mbeki's decision to appoint her as Minister of Education. She retained her post in the cabinet of Kgalema Motlanthe. Newly elected President Jacob Zuma named her Minister of Science and Technology in 2009. She served in the position until her appointment as Minister of Home Affairs in 2012. She returned to the post of Minister of Science and Technology in 2014 and held it until 2018, when she became Minister of Higher Education and Training in the first cabinet of President Cyril Ramaphosa. After the 2019 general election, Pandor was mentioned as a possible candidate for Deputy President of South Africa. She was instead appointed Minister of International Relations and Cooperation.

Early life and education
Grace Naledi Mandisa Matthews was born on 7 December 1953 in Durban, Natal, to Regina Thelma (died 2002) and Joe Matthews (1929–2010), a political and anti-apartheid activist and the son of academic Z. K. Matthews (1901–1968). She received her primary and secondary education in Botswana. She matriculated from Gaborone Secondary School. Between 1973 and 1977, she achieved a Certificate for Continuing Education and a bachelor's degree from the University of Swaziland and the University of Botswana, respectively. She proceeded to head overseas and fulfilled a Diploma in Education and an MA degree from the University of London between 1978 and 1979.

Pandor obtained a diploma in higher education, administration and leadership from the Bryn Mawr Summer Programme in 1992, and soon enrolled at Harvard Kennedy School to receive a diploma in leadership in development in 1997. She also attained an MA degree in linguistics from the University of Stellenbosch in the same year. Pandor received her PhD in education at the University of Pretoria in 2019, with a thesis titled "The contested meaning of transformation in higher education in post-apartheid South Africa".

Teaching career
Pandor became a teacher at the Ernest Bevin School in London in 1980. She was soon employed as a teacher in Gaborone in 1981 and worked as one until 1984. She proceeded to serve as an instructor at the Taung College of Education from 1984 to 1986. Pandor worked as a senior lecturer in English at the University of Bophuthatswana from 1986 to 1989. She soon worked as a senior fellow in the Academic Support Programme of the University of Cape Town between 1989 and 1994.

While at the University of Bophuthatswana, Pandor served as the chair of the university's Union of Democratic Staff Associations between 1988 and 1990. She was appointed the chairperson of the Western Cape National Executive Committee of the National Education Coordinating Committee in 1991 and served in the position until 1993. At the same time, she was part of the ANC's Western Cape Education Committee.

Additionally, Pandor chaired the ANC Athlone Central branch, whilst serving as both the head of the Desmond Tutu Education Trust and the Western Cape School Building Trust.

From 1992 to 1995, she worked as deputy head of the Tertiary Education Fund of South Africa. She soon became head of the fund. She was also deputy chairperson of the Joint Education Trust Board of Trustees between 1993 and 2001.

She was chancellor of Cape Technikon from 2002 to 2004. During the same period, she was a member of the governing council of the University of Fort Hare.

Early parliamentary career

Pandor became a Member of the Parliament in the lower house of Parliament, the National Assembly, following the 1994 general election. Within the ANC caucus, she served as Deputy Chief Whip from 1995 until her deployment to the upper house of Parliament, the National Council of Provinces, in 1998. She served as Deputy Chairperson until her appointment as Chairperson following the 1999 general election. She succeeded inaugural Chairperson Mosioua Lekota when she assumed the office on 21 June 1999. She was the first woman to hold the role. Joyce Kgoali succeeded Pandor in 2004 and consequently became the second woman to hold the role.

National government

Pandor returned to the National Assembly following the 2004 general election. President Thabo Mbeki appointed her to the role of Minister of Education; she took office on 12 May 2004. During her tenure in the portfolio, she was responsible for a complete overhaul of the nation's education system. Pandor initiated reforms to the country's failed implementation of the outcomes-based education (OBE) system. Mbeki resigned in 2008 and left Kgalema Motlanthe in charge. Motlanthe retained Pandor in her position in his interim cabinet.

Following the 2009 general election, Jacob Zuma became the new President of South Africa. He unbundled the Education Ministry into two new portfolios and appointed Pandor to the newly established post of Minister of Science and Technology in May 2009. During her time in the position, Pandor served as a driving force for South Africa to host the Square Kilometre Array (SKA) in the Karoo region. South Africa won the bid.

In October 2012, Nkosazana Dlamini-Zuma resigned as Minister of Home Affairs in order for her to take up the role as Chair of the African Union. Her resignation caused a vacancy in the cabinet. Zuma consequently appointed Pandor as Minister of Home Affairs in an acting capacity on 2 October 2012. Soon after on 4 October 2012, Zuma formally appointed her as Minister of Home Affairs. In October 2013, she served as acting president for a day as Zuma visited the Democratic Republic of the Congo.

Following her re-election in the 2014 general election, Zuma announced that Pandor would return to the Department of Science and Technology. Malusi Gigaba succeeded her as Minister of Home Affairs. She took office on 26 May 2014 and succeeded Derek Hanekom.

Cyril Ramaphosa assumed the office of President in February 2018. Pandor was appointed Minister of Higher Education and Training and took office on 27 February 2018, succeeding Hlengiwe Mkhize.

After the 2019 general election, the Ministry of Higher Education and Training was split. Pandor was speculated to be appointed Deputy President of South Africa. She was Ramaphosa's original choice for Deputy President back in 2017 at the ANC's elective conference. She was instead appointed Minister of International Relations and Cooperation and assumed office on 30 May 2019.

In response to the 2022 Russian invasion of Ukraine, Pandor and the Department of International Relations and Cooperation were initially critical of the invasion and released a statement, in which they called on Russia to withdraw its forces in Ukraine immediately. Ramaphosa was reportedly unhappy with Pandor and the department's statement, because it contradicted South Africa's position that negotiation was needed to end the war. Pandor later backtracked on her position, toeing the party line instead.

On 10 March 2022, Pandor said that she supported the idea of a single African currency to increase intra-continental trade.

In September 2022, Pandor stood in for Ramaphosa at the Seventy-seventh session of the United Nations General Assembly after he had decided to return to South Africa due to the ongoing electricity crisis after his working visit in Washington, D.C. In her address to the assembly, Pandor said that all ongoing wars and conflicts around the world should be given equal attention. She also called for Israel to be held accountable for its "destructive actions" in the Israeli–Palestinian conflict, for the embargo against Cuba to be lifted and echoed the African Union's call for sanctions against Zimbabwe to be lifted.

Pandor was one of a number of sitting cabinet ministers who unsuccessfully sought re-election to the National Executive Committee of the African National Congress at the party's 55th National Conference in December 2022.

Personal life
Pandor is married to Sharif Joseph Pandor, whom she met while studying in Botswana, and they have four children together. She converted to Islam after she met her husband. Her in-laws gave her the Islamic name of Nadia. On her religious conversion, Pandor said: "My parents said God is God. As long as you worship Him we will support you and the Islamic principles are universal. Certainly, Islam demands much more of you in terms of observance."

References

External links

 
 Grace Naledi Mandisa Pandor – South African History Online
 Grace Naledi Mandisa Pandor, Ms – South African Government
  Profile: Dr Naledi Pandor, Minister – Dirco
 Naledi Pandor Biographical notes – dst.gov.za

|-

|-

|-

|-

|-

|-

|-

Living people
Education ministers of South Africa
Ministers of Home Affairs of South Africa
Women government ministers of South Africa
Members of the National Assembly of South Africa
Chairpersons of the National Council of Provinces
Alumni of the University of London
Stellenbosch University alumni
University of Eswatini alumni
South African Muslims
Converts to Islam
People from Durban
Grand Crosses with Star and Sash of the Order of Merit of the Federal Republic of Germany
1953 births
Female interior ministers
Women members of the National Assembly of South Africa
Female foreign ministers
Foreign ministers of South Africa
Fellows of the African Academy of Sciences
Honorary Fellows of the African Academy of Sciences